Bob Hearts Abishola is an American sitcom television series created by Chuck Lorre, Eddie Gorodetsky, Al Higgins, and Gina Yashere that premiered on September 23, 2019, on CBS. It stars Billy Gardell and Folake Olowofoyeku as the respective title characters. In January 2022, the series was renewed for a fourth season, which premiered on September 19, 2022. In January 2023, the series was renewed for a fifth season.

Series overview

Episodes

Season 1 (2019–20)

Season 2 (2020–21)

Season 3 (2021–22)

Season 4 (2022–23)

Ratings

Season 1

Season 2

Season 3

Season 4

References

External links 
 

Lists of American sitcom episodes